Year 1307 (MCCCVII) was a common year starting on Sunday (link will display the full calendar) of the Julian calendar.

Events

By place

Europe 
 October 13 – King Philip IV (the Fair) orders the arrest of the Knights Templar in France. The Templars, together with their Grand Master Jacques de Molay, are imprisoned, interrogated, and tortured into confessing heresy. In Paris, the king's inquisitors torture some 140 Templars, most of whom eventually make confessions. Many are subjected to "fire torture": their legs are fastened in an iron frame and the soles of their feet are greased with fat or butter. Unable to withstand these tortures, many Templars eventually confess.
 Januli I da Corogna seizes the Aegean Island of Sifnos and becomes an autonomous lord, by renouncing his allegiance to the Knights Hospitaller.

England 
 Spring – King Robert I (the Bruce) crosses with a small force (some 600 men) from the Isle of Arran in the Firth of Clyde to his earldom of Carrick in Ayrshire. He attacks the English garrison at Turnberry Castle, plundering and destroying the stronghold. Meanwhile, James Douglas (the Black) attacks the English garrison in Douglas Castle at Palm Sunday – while they are slaughtered during a church mass (known as the "Douglas Larder").
 February – Battle of Loch Ryan: Thomas de Brus and Alexander de Brus sail with an invasion force of 1,000 men and 18 galleys, into the harbor at Loch Ryan. But they are defeated by rival Scots under Dungal MacDouall. During the attack, only two galleys escape and all the leaders are captured. Thomas and Alexander are taken as captives to Carlisle, where they are later executed by being hanged, drawn and quartered on February 17.
 April – Battle of Glen Trool: Scottish forces led by Robert I (the Bruce) defeat the English army at Glen Trool, Galloway. During the battle, Robert gives the order to push down several boulders to ambush the English, who are approaching through a narrow glen (called the "Steps of Trool"). Scottish forces charge down an extremely steep 700-meter sloop, the narrowness of the defile prevents support from either the front or the rear. Without any room to maneuver, many of the English are killed and routed.
 May 10 – Battle of Loudoun Hill: Scottish forces under Robert I (the Bruce) defeat the English army (some 3,000 men) at Loudoun Hill. During the battle, a frontal charge by the English knights led by Aymer de Valence is halted by Robert's spearmen militia, who effectively slaughtered them as they are on marshy ground. Aymer manages to escape the carnage and flees to the safety of Bothwell Castle. The battle marks the turning point in Robert's struggle to reclaim the independence of Scotland.
 July 7 – King Edward I (Longshanks) dies at Burgh by Sands after a 34-year reign. He is succeeded by his son 23-year-old Edward II, who becomes new ruler of England. After his death Edward's body is embalmed and transported to Waltham Abbey in Essex. Here it lay unburied for several weeks so that people can come and see the body lying in state. After this, Edward is taken to Westminster Abbey for a proper burial on October 28.
 July 20 – Edward II travels from London, after he is proclaimed king and continues north into Scotland, where he receives homage from his Scottish supporters at Dumfries, before abandoning the campaign and returning home on August 4. Meanwhile, Edward recalls his friend and favourite, Piers Gaveston, who is in exile, and makes him Earl of Cornwall, before arranging his marriage to the wealthy 13-year-old Margaret de Clare.

Asia 
 Duwa Khan, Mongol ruler of the Chagatai Khanate, dies after a 25-year reign and is succeeded by his son Könchek (until 1308).

By topic

Cities and Towns 
 The village of Heerle in North Brabant is proclaimed an independent parish (modern Netherlands).

Folklore 
 November 18 – William Tell, Swiss mountain climber and marksman, shoots (according to legend) an apple off his son's head with a crossbow at Altdorf, Switzerland.

Births 
 unknown dates
 Alessandra Giliani, Italian female anatomist and scientist (d. 1326)
 William II (or IV), Count of Hainaut, Dutch nobleman (House of Avesnes) (d. 1345)

Deaths 
 January 13 – Wareru,  founder of the Martaban Kingdom (b. 1253)
 February 10 – Temür Khan (or Chengzong), Mongol emperor
 February 17
 Alexander de Brus (or Bruse), Scottish nobleman (b. 1285)
 Reginald Crawford, Scottish nobleman, knight and sheriff
 Thomas de Brus (or Bruse), Scottish nobleman (b. 1284)
 April 23 – Joan of Acre (or Johanna), English princess (b. 1272)
 May 13 – Abu Yaqub Yusuf an-Nasr, Marinid ruler of Morocco
 July 4 – Rudolf I, German nobleman, knight and king (b. 1282)
 July 7 – Edward I (Longshanks), king of England (b. 1239)
 September 21 – Thomas Bitton (or Bytton), English bishop His brother was William of Bitton II, Bishop of Bath from 1267 to 1274.
 October 11 – Catherine I, Latin empress consort (b. 1274)
 November 23 – Diether III, German archbishop (b. 1250)

References